Arkema S.A. is a publicly listed, multi-national manufacturer of specialty materials, headquartered in Colombes, near Paris, France.  It has three specialty materials segments (or divisions); adhesives, advanced materials and coatings. A further segment covers chemical intermediates.

The company was created in 2004, as part of French oil major Total's restructuring of its chemicals business, and floated on the Paris stock exchange in May 2006. Turnover in 2021 was €9.5 billion. Arkema operates in more than 55 countries and has 20,200 employees, 13 research centers and 144 production plants.

History
Arkema was created when French oil major Total restructured its chemicals business in 2004, but the company's roots go back many years.

Origin and evolution 

In 1971, Elf and Total merged their chemical operations into Aquitaine Total Organico (ATO), a joint  subsidiary. The same year saw the creation of Produits Chimiques Ugine Kuhlmann (PCUK). The joint venture was renamed ATO Chimie in 1973. A second company, Chloé Chimie (40% Elf Aquitaine, 40% Total and 20% Rhône-Poulenc) was formed in 1980 to take over Rhône-Poulenc's chlorochemicals business. Three years later, Total sold its stake in Chloé Chimie to Elf and chemical production in France was reorganized around Atochem, a wholly owned Elf Aquitaine subsidiary that incorporated the activities of ATO Chimie, Chloé Chimie and most of PCUK.

In 1989, Elf Aquitaine acquired the American, Pennwalt Corporation and along with M&T Chemicals and Atochem Inc formed Atochem North America Inc. Pennwalt can trace its roots to the formation of The Pennsylvania Salt Manufacturing Co. by five Philadelphia Quakers in 1850. The Pennsylvania Salt Manufacturing Co. changed its name to Pennsalt Chemicals Corp in 1957 and merged with Wallace and Tiernan Inc. to form Pennwalt Corp in 1969.

The year 1990 saw another reorganization of chemical production in France. Orkem's petrochemicals, styrenics, fertilizers and acrylics businesses were integrated into Atochem, while specialties (resin and paint) moved to Total. Montedison's organic peroxide business was acquired. Atochem was renamed Elf Atochem in 1992 and merged with Total's chemical businesses into Atofina a year after the takeover of Elf by TotalFina in 1999.

Formation, independence and listing 
In February 2004, Total, the French-based multinational oil conglomerate announced a reorganisation of its chemicals business. A new company under Total's ownership, named Arkema, was formed on 1 October into which Total placed certain assets held by its Atofina subsidiary, which was then dissolved. The kem part of Arkema's name references the company as a chemicals producer. Arkema was structured into three divisions producing vinyl products (chlorochemicals and PVC, vinyl compounds and pipes and profiles), industrial chemicals (acrylics, fluorochemicals, hydrogen peroxide, PMMA and thiochemicals) and performance products (additives, organic peroxides, agrochemicals and urea-formaldehyde resins).     
 
Total's intention was to spin-off Arkema into an independent listed company. This was achieved on 18 May 2006 when Arkema debuted on the Paris stock market. In June 2011, Arkema joined the CAC Next 20 French stock market index.

Acquisitions, disposals and reconfigurations 
2007:	Arkema sells its agrochemical business (Cerexagri) to United Phosphorus and its urea-formaldehyde activities to Hexion.
2007:	acquires Coatex company (specialty acrylic polymers)
2010:	acquires acrylic Dow assets in the US 
2011:	acquires Total coating resins (Cray Valley and Sartomer)
2012:	acquires Chinese Company Hipro Polymers (producer of bio-Polyamides) and Casda Biomaterials (producer of plant raw materials)

In July 2012, Arkema sold for 1 symbolic euro its vinyl products business segment to the Klesch group for reasons of profitability, but also to re-center its operations exclusively on specialty chemicals. As part of this divestment, Arkema made a 100 million euro cash payment to the Klesch group and took on debts amounting to 470 million euros to help revive the activity. In response to fears of redundancy and to protests from employees at a number of production sites, the trade unions negotiated, with the Arkema management, industrial and social guarantees as well as support measures designed to protect the rights of employees should the Klesch group implement redundancies following their take-over of the vinyl products activities. Hence two trust funds of €20 M were set up to secure compensation payments and the rights of employees of the companies that were sold off. Following the sale, Arkema reorganized its activities into three business segments: High Performance Materials, Industrial Specialties and Coating Solutions. Each represented about one third of Group turnover. 

2015 : Purchase of Bostik from Total S.A.  The company also joined CJ Group of South Korea to invest in the manufacture of L-methionine in Malaysia.

2020 : Plexiglas business sold to the American group Trinseo for $1.1 billion.

2021 : Acquisition of Ashland's Performance Adhesives business for $1.65 billion.

2022 : Acquisition of Permoseal, an adhesive solutions company in South Africa.

Organization

Adhesive Solutions
Formed in 2020 by the transfer of Bostick from the High Performance Materials segment.

Advanced Materials
This segment gathers together four main product lines: specialty polyamides, fluoropolymers (PVDF), molecular sieves for filtration and adsorption and organic peroxides. Brands include Rilsan (polyamide 11), Luperox (Organic Peroxide), Kynar (PVDF), Siliporite (Molecular Sieves).

Coating Solutions
Starting from upstream acrylic monomers, the Group has built a presence across the coating market. Its portfolio of coating materials and technologies includes waterborne, solvent borne, powder coating resins and additives from Arkema Coating Resins, rheology additives for waterborne coatings from Coatex and photocured resins for optic fibers, graphic arts, electronics, etc. from Sartomer. Brands are EnVia, Rheotec, Sarbio.

Intermediates
Includes thiochemicals (for animal nutrition, gas natural odorant), fluorochemicals  (for refrigeration, air conditioning, blowing agent for insulating foam) and hydrogen peroxide (pulp and textile bleaching, chemical synthesis, water treatment). Brands include Albone (hydrogen peroxide), Paladin (DMDS agricultural fumigant) and Forane (refrigerants).

Subsidiaries

•Bostik specializes in bonding solutions;

•Coatex produces rheology additives for water-based formulations. Its production sites are located in France (Genay), the Netherlands (Moerdijk), the United States (Chester, South Carolina), Korea (Kunsan), China (Changshu) and Brazil (Araçariguama). Its main brands are Rheocoat, Coadis, Rheocarb, Ecodis, Viscoatex and Coapur.

•MLPC International specializes in the chemistry of carbon sulphide, cyanogen chloride and amines and produces vulcanising agents for the rubber industry. The company was previously known as "Manufacture Landaise de Produits Chimiques". Its origins go back to 1926. Plants are at Lesgor and nearby Rion-des-Landes, in the Landes department of Nouvelle-Aquitaine in south-western France.

•Sartomer produces specialty acrylates for UV curing systems (photo-crosslinking). 

•Den Braven makes sealants for insulation and construction.

•Casda manufactures sebacic acid from castor oil.

Arkema worldwide

Locations
Arkema operates through industrial facilities in Europe, North America and Asia and marketing subsidiaries in around 40 countries.

Arkema has 144 production facilities worldwide, including 61 in Europe, 43 in North America, 40 in Asia and in the rest of the world.

Arkema has 13 research centers worldwide: 7 in France (Lacq, Serquigny, Cerdato, Carling, Genay, Pierre-Benite and Verneuil), three in the United States (Cary, North Carolina, Wauwatosa, Wisconsin and King of Prussia, Pennsylvania) and two in China (Shanghai and Changshu).

Sales by region
Most of Arkema's sales are generated in Europe, which accounts for 36% of the total. North and South America represents 31% of sales.
Arkema has had a strong presence in China for over 13 years. Asia alone now accounts for 33% of sales.

Incidents and legal actions

Crosby, Texas plant explosion

In August 2017, Hurricane Harvey caused the flooding of Arkema's Crosby, Texas plant. Arkema said it would be unable to prevent an explosion at the plant, after refrigeration equipment failed that kept temperature sensitive organic peroxides cold. On August 31, explosions were reported to be coming from the plant. These turned out to be "small container ruptures" of burning organic peroxides. A 1.5 mile evacuation zone was set up around the site.

Preformation legacy issues

EU antitrust breach
Total, Elf Aquitaine and Arkema were investigated by the EU Commission for involvement in an illegal supply, sales and pricing cartel in the hydrogen peroxide and sodium perborate markets. The Commission found that Arkema's predecessor companies Atochem and Atofina committed the infractions between May 1995 and December 2000. Arkema was fined €78 million in May 2006 for breaching EU antitrust law.

Research and development
Research and development spending totaled roughly 150 million euros, with half allocated to “green chemistry.” Arkema employs more than 1,200 researchers, whose work focuses on two main areas: ultra-high performance polymers and sustainable development solutions.

Financial performance
Arkema generates sales of €7.9 billion, broken down as follows:
Advanced Materials, 32%.
Adhesive Solutions, 25,5%.
Coating Solutions, 24,5%.
Intermediates, 18%.

Arkema's net debt in 2020 is €1,9 billion.

Shareholder structure
As of 31 December 2010, the major stockholders of Arkema (owning at least 5% of  capital declared to AMF) were Greenlight Capital (5,5%), Dodge & Cox (5.2%), Groupe Bruxelles Lambert (10%).

Since January 1, 2012, the level of 5% reported to AMF was passed by:
 FMR LLC (Fidelity Management & Research): declares having +5% of Arkema capital (August 23, 2012);
 Groupe Bruxelles Lambert: sold all its shares in the capital (March 14, 2012);
 Individual shareholders: 94.0%;
 Group employees: 5,5%;

References

External links

French companies established in 2004
Chemical companies of France
Specialty chemical companies
Chemical companies established in 2004
Companies based in Île-de-France
2006 initial public offerings
TotalEnergies
French brands
Corporate spin-offs
Multinational companies headquartered in France
Companies listed on Euronext Paris